All games can be found at Hockeyligan.se.

All times are local (CEST and CET).

Round 1

Round 2

Round 3

Round 4

Round 5

Round 6

Round 7

Round 8

Round 9

Round 10

Round 11

Round 12

Round 13

Round 14

Round 15

Round 16

Round 17

Round 18

Round 19

Round 20

Round 21

Round 23

Round 24

Round 25

Round 26

Round 27

Round 28

Round 29

Round 30

Round 31

Round 32

Round 33

Round 34

References 
 SHL – Statistik

2010–11 Elitserien season
Ice hockey game logs
Swedish Hockey League game logs